Francis Farewell Starlite (born Abe Morre Katz-Milder; 14 June 1981) is an American musician, record producer, singer, songwriter, and dancer. He is best known as the founder and lead vocalist of the pop band Francis and the Lights. He is primarily a vocalist and pianist, and is often credited by the Francis and the Lights name for his solo work.

He is a frequent collaborator of multiple artists and producers, including Kanye West, Justin Vernon of Bon Iver, Benny Blanco, Cashmere Cat, Chance the Rapper, Nico Segal, Frank Ocean and Banks.

Biography

Early life and education
Starlite was born Abe Morre Katz-Milder to a Jewish family on 14 June 1981 in Oakland, California. He was raised in Berkeley, California, and attended Berkeley High School, where he befriended future collaborators and Francis and the Lights members Rene Solomon and Jake Schreier. In 1999, Starlite enrolled at Wesleyan University in Middletown, Connecticut. Starlite befriended future Francis and the Lights collaborator Jake Rabinbach while a student at Wesleyan. Starlite attended Wesleyan from 1999 before ultimately dropping out in 2002. While there, Starlite and Rabinach were schoolmates of MGMT's members Andrew VanWyngarden and Benjamin Goldwasser, whom they have since toured with.

Francis and the Lights

Starlite began traveling across the United States by train in an effort to find what direction he was going to take his life. While on a train traveling from Elkhart, Indiana to New Orleans, Starlite came to the decision that he was going to pursue his passion for music as a career path. In an interview with Entertainment Weekly in 2010, he said, "I had played music and loved it my entire life, but hadn’t fully committed to it. And there was a moment when I wrote down the different things I could do. And then I wrote down, 'I think I’ll give the band a go.'" Shortly afterwards, Starlite returned to his birthplace of Oakland, California, where he lived and worked in a rehearsal space at Soundwave Studios and wrote songs for close to a year. He subsequently drove across the U.S. in a decommissioned postal truck to New York City, where he then formed Francis and the Lights. The band rehearsed for an entire year before starting to perform through a series of invitation-only shows at a white fabric-draped warehouse space.

On 3 November 2008, Starlite incorporated Francis and the Lights, LLC, as a limited liability company, as an alternative to signing a record deal. This was followed by an investment of $100,000 from the Normative Music Company, giving Francis and the Lights, LLC a valuation of $1 million. Normative's president, Jake Lodwick, a friend of Starlite and a co-founder of Vimeo, said, "Francis Starlite is an uncompromising musician and a strong leader. I believe he will bring Francis and the Lights to international stardom. The spectacular live shows, beautiful recordings, and his relentless character back me up." In late 2009, Normative Music Company shut down. The duo have since collaborated on the music app Keezy.

Francis and the Lights have released four EPs and two albums, including Farewell, Starlite! (2016) and Just for Us (2017).

They provided the soundtrack for the film Robot & Frank (2012), directed by friend and collaborator Jake Schreier. Schreier has performed as part of Francis and the Lights, producing some of their work and directing a majority of their music videos.

Starlite works closely with Muxtape founder Justin Ouellette, who has designed several websites and HTML5 music players for Francis and the Lights releases. Ouellette previously worked as engineer for Vimeo alongside Lodwick. He also met Schreier through Starlite and served as a designer for Robot & Frank.

Production career

Starlite rose to prominence after producing and co-writing the song "Karaoke" for Canadian rapper Drake from his 2010 debut album Thank Me Later.

His recent production work is primarily through credits with other producers such as Benny Blanco, Cashmere Cat, Rostam Batmanglij, Ariel Rechtshaid, and Ryan Tedder.

He is the inventor of a layered vocal effect he refers to as the 'Prismizer.' It features prominently on many of his productions, including "Close to You" by Frank Ocean and throughout Coloring Book by Chance the Rapper. Justin Vernon sought to create a real-time solution capable of implementing the effect without latency for use in live performance and on his Bon Iver album 22, A Million. The result was a combination of hardware and software nicknamed 'The Messina' after audio engineer Chris Messina.

Starlite worked with Kanye West on his 2018 albums ye and Kids See Ghosts. Starlite is credited as a writer and producer on ye's "I Thought About Killing You," and as a producer on "All Mine," and "Ghost Town". On Kids See Ghosts, Starlite is credited as a producer on "Feel the Love."

Personal life
Starlite legally changed his name to Francis Farewell Starlite in 2004. When asked in an interview with Entertainment Weekly why he had changed his name, he answered: Let me think about how I want to answer that question. Let me think for a moment. [One minute passes] It’s very difficult because I’m very proud of the fact that I changed my name. It has meaning to me. I believe that people change, and that you are what you make of yourself. And that that is true. That’s true … I don’t want to, I don’t want to … The problem is that I feel like when I start talking about these things, I start to say things that I wouldn’t necessarily want to read myself saying. They might be too easily misinterpreted. So I think I’ll just leave it at that. I’m proud of the fact that I changed my name. I am what I make of myself.

Discography

Francis and the Lights

Striking (2007)
A Modern Promise (2008)
It'll Be Better (2010)
Robot & Frank (2012)
Like a Dream (2013)
Farewell, Starlite! (2016)
Just for Us (2017)

Credits
"Karaoke" (Drake, Thank Me Later) (2010)
"Something Better" (Lyrics Born, As U Were) (2010)
"Celebration" (Das Racist, Relax) (2011)
"I'll Never Forget You" (Birdy, Birdy) (2011)
 "Chameleon/Comedian" (Kathleen Edwards, Voyageur) (2012)
 "La crise" (Brice Guilbert, Feitsong) (2012)
"Wonderful Everyday: Arthur" (Chance the Rapper with The Social Experiment) (2014)
 Big Grrrl Small World (Lizzo) (2015)
Surf (Nico Segal & The Social Experiment) (2015)
Coloring Book (Chance the Rapper) (2016)
"Wild Love" (Cashmere Cat featuring The Weeknd, 9) (2016)
"Close to You" (Frank Ocean, Blonde) (2016)
"Faith" (Stevie Wonder featuring Ariana Grande, Sing: Original Motion Picture Soundtrack) (2016)
"IT'S ALRITE 2 CRY" (Kool A.D. featuring Francis Starlite, HAVE A NICE DREAM) (2016)
"Dear Theodosia" (Chance the Rapper, The Hamilton Mixtape) (2016)
Merry Christmas Lil' Mama (Jeremih and Chance the Rapper) (2016)
"New Man" (Ed Sheeran, ÷) (2017)
"Hold You" (Rostam featuring Angel Deradoorian, Half-Light) (2017)
"Sam" (Jessie Ware, Glasshouse) (2017)
ye (Kanye West) (2018)
"Feel the Love" (Kids See Ghosts featuring Pusha T, Kids See Ghosts) (2018)
"Just for Us, Pt. 2" (Benny Blanco, Friends Keep Secrets) (2018)
"Forgiven" (2 Chainz featuring Marsha Ambrosius, Rap or Go to the League) (2019)
Intellexual (Intellexual) (2019)
"The Most" (Miley Cyrus, She Is Coming) (2019)
"Look What You're Doing to Me" (Banks, III) (2019)
"To Someone Else" (Kacy Hill) (2019)
The Big Day (Chance the Rapper) (2019)
"Faith" (Bon Iver, I, I) (2019)
"I CRY 3" (93PUNX, 93PUNX) (2019)
"For Your Eyes Only" (Cashmere Cat, Princess Catgirl) (2019)
"Selah" (Kanye West, Jesus Is King) (2019)
"Song of Trouble" (CARM featuring Sufjan Stevens, CARM) (2021)

References

1982 births
Living people
People from Berkeley, California
Singers from New York City
Jewish American musicians
Wesleyan University alumni
Berkeley High School (Berkeley, California) alumni
21st-century American singers